Cramond is a historic home located in Tredyffrin Township, Chester County, Pennsylvania. It was designed by the architectural firm of McKim, Mead & White in the Classical Revival style. It was built in 1886, and is a -story, six-bay half-timbered dwelling sided in clapboard.  It has a hipped roof with a pair of hipped dormers and two large brick chimneys.  It is occupied by a private school known as The Goddard School.

It was listed on the National Register of Historic Places in 1983.

References

Houses on the National Register of Historic Places in Pennsylvania
Neoclassical architecture in Pennsylvania
Houses completed in 1886
Houses in Chester County, Pennsylvania
National Register of Historic Places in Chester County, Pennsylvania